Broter is a genus of ground beetles in the family Carabidae. This genus has a single species, Broter ovicollis. It is found in India.

References

Platyninae
Taxa named by Herbert Edward Andrewes